At least three warships of Japan have borne the name Wakaba:

 , a  launched in 1905 and stricken in 1928
 , a  launched in 1934 and sunk in 1944
 , the former  Nashi that was both launched and sunk in 1945. She was salvaged and renamed in 1955 serving until  stricken in 1971

Japanese Navy ship names
Imperial Japanese Navy ship names